S.G. Public School is a secondary school in Mughalsarai, Chandauli district, Uttar Pradesh, India. It was established in 2002. SG Public School is a private co-educational day and boarding school with 1000+ students  in Mughalsarai, India. In 2016 the school completed its 15 years. The foundation stone of the school building was laid in 2001 by Mr. Arun Kumar Agrawal and Mrs. Uma Agrawal.

Education system
The school follows the Central Board of Secondary Education system. The medium of education is English, and the courses selected are prescribed by Education Department and C.B.S.E. board.

References

External links

High schools and secondary schools in Uttar Pradesh
Pandit Deen Dayal Upadhyaya Nagar
Educational institutions established in 2002
2002 establishments in Uttar Pradesh